Brizon is a commune in the Haute-Savoie département in the Auvergne-Rhône-Alpes region in south-eastern France.

Personalities linked to the Place
 Eugène Bourgeau, botanist, born in the commune in 1813.

See also
Communes of the Haute-Savoie department

References

Communes of Haute-Savoie